Andrew McCoy "Mac" Warner (born February 18, 1955) is an American attorney, veteran, and the current West Virginia Secretary of State. He announced his candidacy for Governor of West Virginia in 2024 on January 10, 2023.

Early life and education
Warner graduated from United States Military Academy at West Point and later with a J.D. from West Virginia University School of Law and LL.M. from JAG School and University of Virginia School of Law in International Law.

Career 
Warner served in the United States Army in the U.S. Army JAG Corps. He retired from military service and became a United States Department of State contractor.

Warner reorganized the Secretary of State's office upon taking control of the West Virginia Secretary of State's office, resulting in the firing of approximately 16 staffers.  All employees of the Secretary of State are hired at the "will and pleasure" of the elected office holder and have no civil service status. The Warner layoffs included staff members who have served multiple administrations—Republican and Democrat.
In January 2018, the West Virginia Secretary of State's office announced that it had processed 45,000 new voter registrations in 2017, including 13,995 high school students, while over 86,000 registrations were cancelled due to death, out of date information, duplication, or felony status.
Warner and Attorney General of West Virginia Patrick Morrisey sided with the Ohio Secretary of State in a 2018 U.S. Supreme Court case regarding a state's right to purge voter registration rolls. The court ruled 5-4 in Ohio's favor.

After Donald Trump lost the 2020 election and made false claims of fraud, Warner defended Trump's claims and participated in "Stop the Steal" protests.

Warner opposes the For the People Act, which would expand voting rights. He opposes automatic voter registration, mail-in voting, and same-day voter registration.

Personal life
He lives in Morgantown, West Virginia. He is brothers with Kasey Warner, former United States Attorney for the Southern District of West Virginia and fellow former J.A.G. Corps officer. His other brothers are Kris Warner, former chairman of the West Virginia Republican Party, and Monty Warner, the 2004 Republican nominee for Governor of West Virginia. 
He is the father of four children, who are all current or former Army officers.

References

1950s births
United States Army Judge Advocate General's Corps
Living people
Politicians from Morgantown, West Virginia
Secretaries of State of West Virginia
United States Military Academy alumni
Military personnel from West Virginia
2016 United States presidential electors
University of Virginia School of Law alumni
West Virginia Republicans
West Virginia University alumni
The Judge Advocate General's Legal Center and School alumni
21st-century American politicians
Lawyers from Morgantown, West Virginia
Candidates in the 2024 United States elections